West Village Historic District is a national historic district located at Buffalo in Erie County, New York.  The district is a 19th-century residential neighborhood within walking distance of the central business district and Lake Erie.  It is one of Buffalo's oldest and most intact residential areas, having been developed on the site of the estate of the city's first mayor Ebenezer Johnson and South Village of Black Rock.  It contains 102 structures built between 1854 and 1914, most of which are detached single-family dwellings, with about a dozen apartment buildings. The district reflects architectural styles of the late 19th century including the Second Empire, Gothic Revival, and Italianate style. Included in the district is Johnson Park, redesigned by Frederick Law Olmsted about 1876, and Hutchinson Central Technical High School.

It was listed on the National Register of Historic Places in 1980.

The West Village Historic District is also a Certified Local Historic District, with slightly different boundaries than the National Register listed district. The local district was designated in 1979 and then was certified by the National Park Service in 1983.

External links

References

Historic districts on the National Register of Historic Places in New York (state)
Second Empire architecture in New York (state)
Gothic Revival architecture in New York (state)
Italianate architecture in New York (state)
Geography of Buffalo, New York
Historic districts in Buffalo, New York
National Register of Historic Places in Buffalo, New York